Jabez Olssen (born 5 August 1975) is a New Zealand film and television editor who has worked extensively with director Peter Jackson.

Starting in 1998, Olssen worked in the editorial department of two television programs in New Zealand. He was then hired to work with principal editor Michael J. Horton on The Lord of the Rings: The Two Towers (directed by Peter Jackson – 2002). Olssen was ultimately credited as an "additional editor" on this film. The two editors won the Online Film Critics Society Award and the Las Vegas Film Critics Society Award for this film. 

Olssen said of his work "Anyway, if I never get to edit anything ever again, I can still say that I've edited scenes with Gollum in them and I've edited scenes with Darth Vader in them so, I'm good."

He won an Emmy in the 2022 award ceremony for Outstanding Picture Editing for a Nonfiction Program for his work on The Beatles: Get Back.

Filmography

Editor

References

External links 
 

Living people
New Zealand film editors
New Zealand people of Norwegian descent
1975 births
Primetime Emmy Award winners